William Brooks Bradford (March 15, 1896 – January 12, 1965) was an American Olympic equestrian and career army officer.

Background 
Bradford was born to John Taylor Bradford (1860–1900) and Ida Brooks Bradford (1863–1929) in Tallahassee, Florida. He graduated from the Virginia Military Institute in 1916 and later from the Cavalry School in Saumur, France.

Olympic career 
Bradford participated with the Army Equestrian Team in the 1928 Summer Olympics in Amsterdam, the 1932 Summer Olympics in Los Angeles and was Captain of the team at the 1936 Summer Olympics in Berlin. He placed fourth individually in 1932 and fourth with the team in 1936. For his contributions to equestrian sport, he was awarded the Gold Napoleon Cup by the Polish Ambassador to the United States.

Military career 
Bradford was a career military officer and was eventually promoted to Major General over the course of his career. During World War II he served with distinction in the Pacific Theater and post-war, was Commander of the U.S. Forces in Trieste, Italy. He retired from military service in 1953.

Death 
Bradford died on January 12, 1965, in Rome, Italy at the age of 68 following a prolonged illness. He was buried at Arlington National Cemetery, Section 34, Site 18-A.

References

1896 births
1965 deaths
Olympic equestrians of the United States
Equestrians at the 1932 Summer Olympics
Equestrians at the 1936 Summer Olympics
American male equestrians
Burials at Arlington National Cemetery
United States Army personnel of World War I
United States Army generals of World War II
United States Army generals